Ark Acton Academy, is a coeducational secondary school and sixth form located in the Acton area of the London Borough of Ealing, England.

The school teaches pupils between the ages of 11 to 18. It is sited on Gunnersbury Lane (A4000) just north of Acton Town Underground station.

History

Grammar school
The school was originally known as Acton County Grammar School, which opened in 1906 for 200 boys (at a different site). It was the first purpose-built county grammar school in Middlesex.  From 1926 to 1956 the school's headmaster was GCT Giles, an Old Etonian and communist activist who was President of the National Union of Teachers (NUT) when the Education Act 1944 was introduced. In 1958, the school began admitting girls, becoming fully co-educational in 1966. The year before, in 1965, the school's administration moved from Middlesex County Council to the London Borough of Ealing. When proposals for going comprehensive appeared in 1966, parents took the LEA to court and lost.

Comprehensive
The school became a comprehensive in 1967, when Ealing borough adopted the three tier system, and was known as Acton County Comprehensive and in 1974 became Reynolds High School, named after local politician and former pupil Gerry Reynolds who has been a Minister in the 1960's and had been tipped for higher office. The 18-year-old "graduation" year of 1976 produced 4 university students out of an intake of 180 in 1969. School colours were brown and cream, with a badge showing a ring of oak leaves around a portcullis with the school name superimposed. The school roll in 1979 amounted to 1040 pupils and until its final years, consisted of eight forms per year.
In the 1970s, the neighbouring Ealing Mead County school off Popes Lane, opened in 1962, was found to have serious structural problems in its building. After only eight years of use, Ealing Mead had to be closed and demolished. As a result, the pupils of the school were distributed around the other local schools and Reynolds High School absorbed a significant proportion of them.

Reynolds High School closed in July 1984 primarily due to falling school roll but re-opened in September the same year as Acton High School following a merger with the Faraday High School, formerly based at Bromyard Avenue. The old brick buildings, dating from 1939, were demolished in 2005, and a new school building built on the same site.

Academy
Previously a community school administered by Ealing London Borough Council, in September 2018 Acton High School converted to academy status and was renamed Ark Acton Academy. The school is now sponsored by Ark Schools.

Notable former pupils

Acton County Grammar School

 Sir Austin Bide, chemist and industrialist
 Anthony Valentine, actor
 Pete Townshend, musician, founder member of The Who
 Roger Daltrey CBE, musician, founder member of The Who
 John Entwistle, musician, founder member of The Who
 John "Speedy" Keen, musician for Thunderclap Newman, who wrote the 1960s song Something in the Air and a song for The Who, Armenia City in the Sky
 Colin Phipps, petroleum geologist and Labour MP from 1974–9 for Dudley West
 Leonard E. H. Williams CBE DFC, Chief Executive from 1967 to 1981 of the Nationwide Building Society
 Ian Gillan, musician, lead singer of Deep Purple

Reynolds High School
 Warren Neill, professional footballer with QPR and Portsmouth FC

Acton High School
 Paul Bruce, Professional footballer (1996–2008)
 Gemma Cairney, BBC Radio 1Xtra DJ and fashion stylist
 Jamal Edwards CBE, entrepreneur/founder of SBTV
 Caroline O'Connor, Olympic rowing coxswain

Notable staff
 Zacron, born Richard Drew (1943–2012) was an English artist who designed the Led Zeppelin III album cover. Head of Art Teacher during the mid 70s
 GCT Giles, Headmaster, President NUT, leading communist.

References

External links
Ark Acton Academy official website

Secondary schools in the London Borough of Ealing
Educational institutions established in 1906
1906 establishments in England
Academies in the London Borough of Ealing
Acton, London
Ark schools